In mathematical logic, a first-order predicate is a predicate that takes only individual(s) constants or variables as argument(s). Compare second-order predicate and higher-order predicate.

This is not to be confused with a one-place predicate or monad, which is a predicate that takes only one argument. For example, the expression "is a planet" is a one-place predicate, while the expression "is father of" is a two-place predicate.

See also
First-order predicate calculus
Monadic predicate calculus

References

Predicate logic
Concepts in logic